The Cooper's Hill Cheese-Rolling and Wake is an annual event held on the Spring Bank Holiday at Cooper's Hill, near Gloucester in England. The event was traditionally held by and for the people who live in the local village of Brockworth, but now people from all over the world take part. The Guardian called it a "world-famous event", with winners coming from America, Canada, Australia, New Zealand, and Nepal.

The cheese-rolling event returned on Sunday 5 June 2022 after a two-year absence: it had been cancelled in 2020 and 2021 due to the COVID-19 pandemic. The 2022 spring bank holiday was moved to June 2 and was followed by an additional bank holiday, to create a four-day jubilee weekend in celebration of Elizabeth II's 70 years of reign.

Format
From the top of the hill, a  round of Double Gloucester cheese is sent rolling down the hill, which is 200 yards long. Competitors then start racing down the hill after the cheese. The first person over the finish line at the bottom of the hill wins the cheese. Multiple races are held during the day, with separate events for men and women.

In the 2013 competition, a foam replica replaced the cheese for reasons of safety. The winners were given prizes of actual cheese.

History

This ceremony originally took place each Whit Monday, but was later moved to the Spring Bank Holiday. The first written evidence of cheese rolling is found in a message written to the Gloucester town crier in 1826; even then it was apparent that the event was an old tradition, and it is believed to be at least six hundred years old.

Two possible origins have been proposed for the ceremony. First, it may have evolved from a requirement for maintaining grazing rights on the common. Second, there may be pagan origins for the custom of rolling objects down the hill. It is thought that bundles of burning brushwood were rolled down the hill to represent the birth of the New Year after winter. Connected with this belief is the traditional scattering of buns, biscuits and sweets at the top of the hill by the Master of Ceremonies. This is said to be a fertility rite to encourage the fruits of harvest.

In 1982, a team of students from the University of Bristol filmed the 31 May event using film cameras, with one camera was set on slow motion.

In 1993, fifteen people were injured, four seriously, chasing cheeses down the hill with its one-in-three gradient.

In 2009, it was cancelled due to concerns over health and safety. In 2010, a group of journalists and local residents threw a smaller version, in keeping with tradition, to keep grazing rights. In 2011, Candis Phillips and Sara Stevens bought and dressed four cheeses, and so the revival of this famous old tradition continued.

The 2011 event took place without management, due to safety concerns over the number of people visiting the event, resulting in the 'Save the Cheese Roll' campaign. Despite the cancellation and lack of paramedics, around 500 people showed up in 2011 to hold some spontaneous races; no major injuries were reported.

The event is traditional and takes its name from the steep hill on which it occurs. Until recent years, it was managed in a quasi-official manner by nominated locals, but since 2010 the event has taken place spontaneously without any management.

The cheese-rolling event was cancelled in 2020 and 2021 as a result of the COVID-19 pandemic, returning in June 2022.

Cheese

The cheese currently used in the event is  Double Gloucester, a hard cheese traditionally made in a circular shape. Each is protected for the rolling by a wooden casing round the side, and is decorated with ribbons at the start of the race. Formerly, three cheeses were presented by parishioners, and the cheeses were usually rolled by them. A collection is usually made now to purchase them, as well as sweets, and also to provide prize money.

Since 1988, the cheese has been supplied by local cheesemaker Diana Smart and her son Rod, from their Churcham farm, although Diana Smart has now retired. In May 2013, a police inspector warned the 86-year-old Smart that she could be held responsible for injuries. Chief Superintendent Nigel Avron of Gloucestershire Constabulary also made these comments: "If you are an organiser in some way or some capacity you could potentially be held liable for something that took place at that event". In recent years, organisers of the event, have felt compelled to use a lightweight foam version for safety reasons. In the second race of 2013, Australian Caleb Stalder managed to catch the fake cheese and claim victory, despite being some way behind the leaders.

Injuries
Due to the steepness and uneven surface of Cooper's Hill, there are usually a number of injuries each year. A first aid service is provided by the local St John Ambulance (Gloucester, Cheltenham and Stroud Divisions) at the bottom of the hill. Members of the local rugby club and Young Farmers volunteer their services by acting as 'catchers' for any participants who lose their balance and also are on hand to carry down any casualties requiring first aid who do not reach the bottom. A number of ambulance vehicles attend the event, since there is invariably at least one and often several injuries requiring hospital treatment.

Cooper's Hill Cheese Rolling has been summarised by a previous participant as "twenty young men chasing a cheese off a cliff and tumbling 200 yards to the bottom, where they are scraped up by paramedics and packed off to hospital". This quotation was reported in The Sydney Morning Herald newspaper of 13 November 2008, in an amusingly titled article 'Return to Edam'. The same article reports one Scottish competitor prodding another in the ribs at the top of the hill, quizzing him if his "travel insurance cover[s] this"? The Australian author, Sam Vincent, "questions his sanity" as he is "crouched on the summit of a diabolical slope", alongside thirteen other competitors whilst they are "awaiting the call to start what is surely the world's most dangerous footrace".

Results

Multiple winners

Men's race
 Chris Anderson 23, Steve Gyde 21, Steven Brain 18, Izzy (Islwyn) John 13, Ryan Fairley 5, Hugh Atkinson 5,  Aaron Walden 3, Jason Crowther  3, Craig Fairley 4, Craig Carter 2, Craig Brown 2.

Ladies' race
Flo Early 4 (2008, 2016, 2018, 2019), 
Rosemary Cooke 3 (1953, 1955, 1956), 
Amanda Turner 3 (1981, 1982, 1983), 
Dionne Carter  3 (2004, 2005, 2006), 
Lucy Townsend 3 (2012, 2013, 2014),
Kirsty Shepherd 2 (2000, 2002),
Keavy Morgan 2 (2015, 2017).
Rebecca Haines 2 (1987 , 1988)

Similar events

An annual cheese-rolling event has taken place in Chester since about 2002, to promote the town's food and drink festival. The rolling takes place on the flat down an obstacle course.

Cheese-rolling in popular culture
1948:‘Cheese Rolling on Cooper’s Hill’ is a painting by Charles March Gere, is part of the Museum of Gloucester Collection, and depicts a live action scene of the event.
1982: A short documentary film ‘Cheese Rolling Day May 31, 1982’, written and directed by James Hartzell, and filmed by University of Bristol students and friends, analyses the event happening that day.
1997: The cheese rolling event appears in episode 16 of the novel Mason and Dixon by author Thomas Pynchon. In the scene, Charles Mason himself is nearly struck by a large cheese-wheel rolling down the hill.
2005: A children's computer game from Neopets named "Cheeseroller", involves different varieties of outlandish cheeses, rolled down a 120-metre hill in under 60 seconds, negotiating obstacles on route. Points are awarded for grade of cheese difficulty and speed of descent.
2007: Cheese rolling appeared in the television series ER, Season 14 Episode 8, "Coming Home", where a motley bunch of cheese rolling enthusiasts (with accents of dubious accuracy) have a dispute, allowing Morris to demonstrate the Judgment of Solomon.
2008: Cheese rolling was prominently featured in the first episode of the UK television channel Five series: Rory & Paddy's Great British Adventure, broadcast on 13 August 2008, and was described as "the grandaddy of weird sports" by the titular Rory McGrath and Paddy McGuinness.
2011: Cheese rolling footage from SoGlos was used in Off the Air at the end of the series premiere episode "Animals".
2014: The NPR news quiz show Wait Wait... Don't Tell Me featured cheese-rolling in a 'Not My Job' segment with skier Mikaela Shiffrin.
2018: The contest was the subject of the BBC One programme The Great Cheese Chase.
2019: Let's Roll is short film directed by Chris Thomas about a teenage girl Antonia (Amy Bowden) attempting to emulate her brother's successes in the cheese rolling, but having strong opposition from her mother (Zara Ramm). The film was screened at numerous international and BAFTA-qualifying film festivals including Norwich and Edinburgh.
2019: Royal Mail issue a collectable stamps edition of UK Weird and Wonderful Customs which includes Bog snorkelling at Llanwrtyd Wells, World Gurning Championship at Egremont, Up Helly Aa in Lerwick, Burning the Clocks in Brighton, 'Obby 'Oss festival in Padstow, Samhain Celtic festival (Halloween) at Derry, Horn Dance at Abbots Bromley and Cheese-Rolling at Cooper's Hill.
2020: Netflix released a documentary We are the Champions, covers six bizarre events and competitions from across the world, starting with Cheese-Rolling at Cooper's Hill. The Cheese-Rolling follows Flo Early in her preparations for 2019 and her attempt to win the ladies race for the fourth time, which had never been achieved before.
2020: Channel 4 reality show Gogglebox featured the Netflix documentary named We are the Champions, following Flo Early's historical achievement in the 2019 ladies cheese rolling race.

See also

Coopers Edge

References

External links

Cheese Rolling Coopers Hill Gloucestershire facebook
BBC Gloucestershire
SoGlos.com videos and event preview
Lets Roll (short film) starring Amy Bowden
Netflix's We are the Champions Trailer

Sport in Gloucestershire
Cheese festivals
Cotswolds
English traditions
Annual events in England
Novelty running